Nicholas Gillett may refer to:

Nicholas Gillett (peace educator)
Sir Nicholas Danvers Penrose Gillett, 3rd Baronet (born 1955), of the Gillett baronets
Nicolas Gillet, French footballer

See also
Gillett (surname)